FabricLive.23 is a DJ mix compilation album by Death in Vegas, as part of the FabricLive Mix Series.

Reception
FabricLive.23 was well-received by Allmusic writer David Jeffries, who gave it three and a half stars out of five, calling it "a satisfying mix that's more headphones than dancefloor...step two in Death in Vegas' thrilling rebirth as a heady mavericks". Andrew McLachlan, reviewing the album for PopMatters, also viewed it positively, calling it "a great record...a record for Death in Vegas fans but also for electronica fans".

Track listing
  Solvent - Science With Synthesizers - Ghostly International
  Death in Vegas - Zugaga - Drone
  Slacknoise Vs Plexus - Ana Tak 2 - Minus Inc.
  Death in Vegas - Heil Xanax - Drone
  Alex Smoke - Lost In Sound - Soma Recordings
  Mossa - Cheap Therapy - Mo's Ferry Productions
  Cybotron - Alleys Of Your Mind - Tresor
  Solvent - Think Like Us (Ectomorph Mix) - Ghostly International
  Alex Cortex - Phlogiston - PAL
  Dinky - Acid In My Fridge - Cocoon Recordings
  Mathew Jonson - Marionette - Wagon Repair
  Alex Smoke - Neds - Vakant
  Wighnomy Brothers - Pele Bloss - Freude-am-Tanzen Recordings
  Death in Vegas - Reigen (Acid Mix) - Drone
  Analog Fingerprints - Accent - Pigna Records
  Blue Ketchuppp - Don't Trust Your Computer - Bee Records
  Death in Vegas - Natja (Scorpio Rising Mix) - SonyBMG
  Mathew Jonson - Typerope - Itiswhatitis Recordings
  John Dahlbäck - Jenna - Morris Audio

References

External links
Fabric: FabricLive.23

2005 compilation albums
Death in Vegas albums